Lerie Ward is a ward located under Nagaland's capital city, Kohima. The ward falls under the designated Ward No. 15 of the Kohima Municipal Council.

Education

Educational Institutions in Lerie Ward
Colleges
 KROS College
Schools
 St. Mary's Cathedral Higher Secondary School
 The Vineyard School

See also
 Municipal Wards of Kohima

References

External links
 Map of Kohima Ward No. 15

Kohima
Wards of Kohima